Abuse is physical or mental mistreatment. 

Abuse may also refer to:
Abuse (video game), a 1996 video game published by Origin Systems and Electronic Arts 
Substance abuse, the maladaptive use of drugs, alcohol and other substances

See also
Abus (disambiguation)
Abuse of language (disambiguation)